The Swatch FIVB World Tour 2009 is an international beach volleyball competition.

The tour consists of 12 tournaments with both genders and 7 separate gender tournaments.

The 2009 SWATCH FIVB Beach Volleyball World Championships is part of the tour.

Grand Slam
There are four Grand Slam tournaments. These events give a higher number of points and more money than the rest of the tournaments.
Gstaad, Switzerland– 1 to 1 Energy Grand Slam, July 7–12, 2009
Moscow, Russia– Grand Slam Moscow, July 14–19, 2009
Marseille, France– World Series 13 Grand Chelem, July 21–26, 2009
Klagenfurt, Austria– A1 09 presented by Volksbank, July 28 - August 2, 2009

Tournament results

Women

Men

Medal table by country

References

Beachvolleyball-News: Beach World-Tour, volleyballer.de
Beach Volleyball Database

External links
2009 Swatch FIVB World Tour - tour calendar at FIVB.org
Beachvolley at Swatch.com

 

2009 in beach volleyball
2009